Ezio is an opera libretto by Pietro Metastasio, first officially set to music by Pietro Auletta and premièred in the Teatro delle Dame, Rome, on December 26, 1728; an unauthorized setting by Nicola Porpora had already been premièred a month earlier (November 20) in Venice.

Other notable settings include:
Ezio (Handel), King's Theatre, London 1732
Ezio (Mysliveček, 1775), Naples
Ezio (Mysliveček, 1777), Munich – completely new music
Ezio (Gluck), Prague 1750, revised Vienna 1763
Ezio (1730), Johann Adolph Hasse, Naples, revised Dresden 1755
Ezio (1750), Davide Perez, Teatro Regio Ducale, Milan
Ezio (1757), Tommaso Traetta, Teatro delle Dame, Rome
Ezio (Latilla), Naples 1758

References

Libretti by Metastasio
1728 compositions